Nicole Wilkins (born February 5, 1984) is an American IFBB professional figure and fitness competitor, fitness model, and fitness trainer. She is the first 4-time winner of the IFBB Figure Olympia Competition and 3-time winner of the IFBB Figure International held during the Annual Arnold Classic.

Early life
Wilkins graduated with a B.A. from Oakland University in health, wellness, and injury prevention.

Career

Aged 19, Wilkins prepared for her first fitness competition at the 2003 NPC in Western Michigan where she placed 1st in the fitness competition.

The following year, as a junior in college, she competed in five more competitions, alternating between the Fitness and Figure divisions. Over the next three years she moved from the local/regional to the national level to get her pro card and gain entry into the IFBB Professional League.

In July 2007, Wilkins competed at the NPC Team Universe Championships in New York City where she crossed over and competed in both categories, Fitness and Figure (2007's Team Universe was the last time competing in two divisions was allowed). She won the Overall in both categories, beating 200 women from across the nation to win her pro card. This was the first time that a competitor had won both Fitness and Figure overall titles at the same national-level contest.

One year later she made her professional debut as an IFBB competitor at the 2008 Arnold Classic in Columbus.

In 2009, Wilkins became the youngest woman in the history of the sport to win the Figure Olympia contest. In 2010, she won 1st place in the Arnold Classic, but lost the Figure Olympia title to Erin Stern. 

In 2011, she came back to win 5 titles and became the first person to reclaim Figure Olympia title, as well as the first person to win the Figure Olympia and the Figure International in the same year.

In 2012, she was runner up in the Figure Olympia to competitor Erin Stern, but she reclaimed the title again in 2013, and had her fourth Figure Olympia win in 2014.
 
Wilkins is a certified trainer by the IFPA.

Competitions

2007 NPC Junior Nationals Bodybuilding, Fitness And Figure Contest - 2nd
4  times IFBB Figure Olympia Champion -        2009, 11, 13, 14

References

External links
  Official Website 

Fitness and figure competitors
Living people
1984 births
Oakland University alumni